Roe was launched in France in 1792, almost certainly under another name. The British captured her and between 1801 and 1808 she became a slave ship, making four voyages out of Liverpool. After the end of the British slave trade Roe traded with Brazil. The Americans captured her in 1812 but she was quickly recaptured. She was wrecked in November 1814.

Career
Roe first appeared in Lloyd's Register (LR) in 1801 with A.Nicholson, master, John Shaw, owner, and trade Liverpool–Africa. In 1797 Shaw had owned an earlier slave ship named  that the French had captured in 1798 after she had delivered to Demerara the saves that she had acquired.

1st slave voyage (1801–1802)
Captain Alexander Nicholson acquired a letter of marque on 24 September 1802. He sailed from Liverpool for West Africa on 
19 November. Roe arrived at Havana on 20 June 1802, where she landed 350 slaves. She sailed from Havana on 29 July, and arrived back at Liverpool on 13 September. She had left with 36 crewmen and she suffered two crew deaths on her voyage.

2nd slave voyage (1802–1804)
Captain Thomas Molyneux sailed from Liverpool on 30 December 1802, bound for West Africa. Roe arrived in Kingston, Jamaica on 26 November 1803 and there disembarked 343 slaves. She sailed from Kingston on 22 March 1804, and arrived back at Liverpool on 20 May. She had left with 3 crew members and suffered six deaths on the voyage.

3rd slave voyage (1805–1806)
Captain James Irwin acquired a letter of marque on 10 November 1804. He sailed from Liverpool on 14 January 1805, bound for the Congo River. Roe arrived at Suriname 28 October 1805 and landed 347 slaves. She left Suriname on 30 April 1806 and arrived back at Liverpool on 9 June. She had left Liverpool with 55 crew members and she suffered 13 crew deaths on the voyage. Roe underwent repairs in 1806.

4th slave voyage (1807–1808)
Captain John Harvey acquired a letter of marque on 16 January 1807. He sailed from Liverpool on 21 January 1807, bound for West Africa. Roe arrived at Kingston on 26 August and landed 315 slaves there. She left on 26 April 1808 and arrived back at Liverpool on 2 Jul. At some point on the voyage Captain James Higgins replaced Captain Harvey.

The Slave Trade Act 1807 ended Britain's participation in the Trans-Atlantic slave trade.

Mercantile trade
Although both Lloyd's Register and the Register of Shipping continued to carry stale information showing Harvey as master and Roe trade as Liverpool–Africa, both master and trade changed. Roe, Bateman, master, arrived at Rio de Janeiro on 6 July 1810/

Captain John Oberry acquired a letter of marque on 6 August 1812.

On 28 November, the American privateer , John Dameron, master, of seven guns and 90 men, captured Roe, Oberry, master, to windward of Barbados. Roe was sailing from Liverpool to Madeira. An American account stated that when Bona fired on Roe Bonas pivot gun burst. Dameron then put 29 officers and men into boats and they boarded Roe. There was some fighting but negligible casualties before Roe struck. Dameron sighted two strange sails coming up so he left the prize crew on Roe and sailed away in an attempt to draw the approaching vessels after him.

The British recaptured Roe and sent her into Barbados. Roe sailed from Barbados for Martinique on 30 December.

Fate
On 3 August 1814 Roe, Oberry, master, ran ashore at Liverpool while on a voyage from Liverpool to Pensacola. She was totally wrecked but her cargo was able to be landed.

Notes, citations, and references
Notes

Citations

References
 

1792 ships
Ships built in France
Age of Sail merchant ships of England
Liverpool slave ships
Captured ships
Maritime incidents in 1814